1080° Avalanche is a snowboarding video game for the GameCube, developed by Nintendo's in-house development studio, Nintendo Software Technology, and published by Nintendo. It was released in 2003 in Europe and North America, and in Japan on January 22, 2004. Avalanche is a sequel to the 1998 video game 1080° Snowboarding for the Nintendo 64.

In contrast to similar snowboarding games such as the SSX series, the game emphasizes more on downhill racing than stunts and tricks. Gameplay can output in 480p and Dolby Pro Logic II and supports four players on one GameCube as well as LAN play with up to four GameCubes.

Gameplay
Similar to 1080° Snowboarding, gameplay focuses on racing more than performing stunts. There are differences between this game and Snowboarding, with one being the Avalanche - the final event of every Match Race challenge is a daredevil run through an avalanche-prone trail where the player has to outrun an avalanche that starts in the middle of the run or even at the very start. In over 20 courses, the players can compete in the main Match mode, along with Trick Attack, Time Trial and Gate modes.

Unlike the first game, each rider has unique boards, and up to three new boards for each character can be unlocked along with bonus boards, which are surreal objects replacing the snowboard, such as a penguin or a NES controller.

Development and release
In 1999, a sequel to 1080° Snowboarding was announced for the Nintendo 64. Second-party studio Left Field was responsible for development, but when the studio revoked its status as a second-party studio to focus on multi-format titles, the game failed to materialize. Development of the game was handed to Nintendo's American development studio, Nintendo Software Technology Corporation (NST), who would migrate the title to Nintendo's newest venture, the GameCube.

1080°: Avalanche was released in both single-disc and double-disc versions. The second disc is a standard miniDVD featuring a half-hour of snowboarding footage alongside gameplay footage set to soundtracks from the game. This version was exclusively available at Wal-Mart and can be differentiated by the presence of a red sash on the front cover.

Reception

It received a score of 7.5/7/5.5 from Electronic Gaming Monthly. Dan Hsu, the first reviewer, found fault with the game's trick system, while the third reviewer Shawn Elliott severely criticised it, who believed that Avalanche can't compete with SSX 3.

Notes

References

External links
  
 1080° Avalanche at Nintendo.com (archives of the original at the Internet Archive)
 

2003 video games
GameCube games
GameCube-only games
1080° (video game series)
Nintendo Software Technology games
Racing video games
Snowboarding video games
Multiplayer and single-player video games
Video games developed in the United States